Gbemisola Ikumelo is a British actress, comedian and writer. She has won a BAFTA award for her short Brain in Gear and best female comedy performance from the Royal Television Society for her role in her show Famalam.

Life and career
Ikumelo aspired to be a serious actress and at fifteen she was in the National Youth Theatre. She went on to study in Scotland at the Queen Margaret University in Edinburgh. Her break came when she was cast in Sunny D in 2015 playing the main character (Dane Baptiste)'s twin sister.

She came to notice when her sketch show Famalam appeared on the BBC. In 2021 she received an award for best female comedy performance in Famalam from the Royal Television Society.

Ikumelo was awarded a TV BAFTA for her short film, titled Brain in Gear in July 2020.

Ikumelo is a main cast member on the Amazon series A League of Their Own. It concerns the creation of a women's American baseball team during the second world war and it is adapted from the 1992 film.

It was announced in 2022 that Ikumelo would be starring in a new BBC series titled Black Ops with actor Hammed Animashaun and Famalam's producer Akemnji Ndifornyen. Ikumelo plays a woman who signs up to be a community police officer to improve her community, but she and her partner get involved in complication over six episodes. The series is destined for terrestrial channel BBC1 and streaming via the BBC's iplayer.

Ikumelo was also named in 2022 for the cast of a remake of the 1989 film Road House with Jake Gyllenhaal, Daniela Melchior and Billy Magnussen.

References

External links 
 
 

Living people
20th-century British actresses
21st-century British actresses
20th-century British comedians
21st-century British comedians
Black British actresses
Alumni of Queen Margaret University
Year of birth missing (living people)